is a city located in Kanagawa Prefecture, Japan., the city had an estimated population of 136,312 and a population density of 5100 persons per km2.

Geography
Ebina is located approximately 50 kilometers from central Tokyo and 20 kilometers from Yokohama. The city is roughly rectangular, 8.7 kilometers north-to-south by 6.15 kilometers east-to-west, with an elevation of 11 to 84 meters above sea level. It is in the middle of the Sagami Plain, part of western Kantō Plain. The city sits on the eastern bank of the Sagami River, and the Hikiji River flows through part of the city. The Tōmei Expressway cuts across the southern end of the city.

Surrounding municipalities
Kanagawa Prefecture
Atsugi
Samukawa
Zama
Ayase
Fujisawa
Yamato

Climate
Ebina has a Humid subtropical climate (Köppen Cfa) characterized by warm summers and cool winters with light to no snowfall.  The average annual temperature in Ebina is 15.2 °C. The average annual rainfall is 1632 mm with September as the wettest month. The temperatures are highest on average in August, at around 25.6 °C, and lowest in January, at around 5.2 °C.

Demographics
Per Japanese census data, the population of Ebina has grown steadily over the past century.

History
The area of modern Ebina has been settled since prehistoric times, and has a number of remains from the Kofun period. Ebina became the provincial capital of Sagami Province in the Nara period, and was the location of the kokubunji, or provincial temple. It was home to the Yokoyama clan, one of the seven warrior clans of the Musashi region during the early Kamakura period. During the Edo period, the lands around Ebina were tenryō territory theoretically administered directly by the Tokugawa Shogunate in Edo; however, in reality, the area was a patchwork of small fiefs held by various hatamoto, as well as exclaves under the control of Sakura Domain and Karasuyama Domain.

After the Meiji Restoration, the area became part of Kōza District, Kanagawa Prefecture and was administratively divided into Ebina Village and Arima Village on April 1, 1889 with the establishment of the modern municipalities system. The area was connected by rail in 1926 via the Sagami Railway and in 1927 by the Odakyu Electric Railway, leading to an increase in population and a change in status of Ebina from village to town in 1940. In 1955, Arima Village merged into Ebina Town. Ebina was elevated to city status on November 1, 1971. Urban development projects in the 1980s and 1990s have modernized the city center.

Government
Ebina has a mayor-council form of government with a directly elected mayor and a unicameral city council of 22 members. Ebina contributes one member to the Kanagawa Prefectural Assembly. In terms of national politics, the city is part of Kanagawa 13th district of the lower house of the Diet of Japan.

Economy

Ebina is home to over 150 factories. The town is a center of the production of electrical appliances, metal products, and machinery. Taito operates the Ebina Development Center in Ebina. The city was once known for its broad rice paddies, but agriculture now centers on the cultivation of strawberries, tomatoes, and ornamental plants. Ebina serves as a bedroom community to the greater Tokyo and Yokohama area.

Education
Ebina has 13 public elementary schools and six public middle schools operated by the city government. The city has three public high schools operated by the Kanagawa Prefectural Board of Education, and the prefecture also operates two special education schools for the handicapped.

Transportation

Railway
 JR East – Sagami Line
 –––
 Odakyu Electric Railway – Odakyū Odawara Line
 –
 Sagami Railway – Sagami Railway Main Line
 ––

Highway
  - Ebina Service Area - Ebina Junction
  - Ebina-minami Junction
  - Ebina-minami Junction - Ebina Interchange - Ebina Junction

Local attractions
Sagami Kokubun-ji, provincial temple of Sagami Province and national historic site
Ebina Premium Film Festival (held annually in autumn)

Notable people from Ebina
Akiko Kijimuta, former professional tennis player
Haruma Saikyo, kickboxer
Kensuke Kitahama, professional shogi player, ranked 8-dan
Miyu Nagasaki, table tennis player
Naoko Kijimuta, former professional tennis player
Riko Gunji, badminton player
Syuri Kondo, professional wrestler, shoot boxer, kickboxer and mixed martial artist
Takashi Kamoshida, Japanese football player (Fukushima United FC, J3 League)
Yukiya Yokoyama, former Nippon Professional Baseball pitcher

References

External links

Official Website 

 
Cities in Kanagawa Prefecture